Desmethylcitalopram is an active metabolite of the antidepressant drugs citalopram (racemic) and escitalopram (the S-enantiomer, which would be called desmethylescitalopram). Like citalopram and escitalopram, desmethylcitalopram functions as a selective serotonin reuptake inhibitor (SSRI), and is responsible for some of its parents' therapeutic benefits.

See also 
 Desmethylsertraline
 Desmethylvenlafaxine
 Didesmethylcitalopram
 Norfluoxetine

References 

Isobenzofurans
Fluoroarenes
Nitriles
Human drug metabolites
Selective serotonin reuptake inhibitors